Gemophos is a genus of sea snails, marine gastropod mollusks in the family Pisaniidae.

Species
Species within the genus Gemophos include:
 Gemophos auritulus (Link, 1807)
 Gemophos filistriatus Vermeij, 2001
 Gemophos gemmatus (Reeve, 1846)
 Gemophos inca (d' Orbigny, 1839)
 Gemophos janellii (Valenciennes, 1846)
 Gemophos pacei Petuch & Sargent, 2011
 Gemophos pastinaca (Reeve, 1846)
 Gemophos ringens (Reeve, 1846)
 Gemophos sanguinolentus (Duclos, 1833)
 Gemophos tinctus (Conrad, 1846)
 Gemophos viverratoides (d'Orbigny, 1840)
 Gemophos viverratus (Kiener, 1834)

References

 Vermeij G.J. 2006. The Cantharus group of pisaniine buccinid gastropods: review of the Oligocene to Recent genera and description of some new species of Gemophos and Hesperisternia. Cainozoic Research 4(1): 71-96

Pisaniidae